Wished is a Chinese fantasy comedy film directed by Dayyan Eng, written by Justin Malen & Dayyan Eng. The film stars Xia Yu, Yan Ni, Pan Binglong and Victoria Song. It was released in China on June 30, 2017. Wished had the highest audience scores (averaging 8.0/10) across the top 4 ticketing platforms for local Chinese comedies released that crowded summer. As an indie-film on limited screens, Wished debuted in third place at the Chinese box office—behind Transformers 5 and a Chinese sci-fi action film. It went on to beat market expectations to gross RMB$70 million at the box office in two weeks. According to Entgroup Data, Wished was the most watched feature film online across all movie sites in China during its first week of online release, and racked up a total of 100,000,000+ paid viewings across three of the top movie sites in China after just over a fortnight. Wished was invited to the 2017 Hawaii International Film Festival and won several awards at the Chinese American Film Festival, Los Angeles Film Awards and New York Film Awards. In 2019, Wished was optioned by an American film company to be remade as an American film.

Synopsis
A 30-something salesman is disillusioned with his life after failing to achieve his career goals and breaking up with his girlfriend. He meets a magical celestial being who starts making his old wishes come true — including those from childhood.

Cast 
Xia Yu
Yan Ni
Victoria Song 
Pan Binlong
David Wu
Daniel Wu (cameo)
Wang Baoqiang (voice cameo)
Bao Bei'er (cameo)
Ning Jing (cameo)
Mike Sui (cameo)

Awards 

 WINNER - Golden Angel Award - 2017 Chinese American Film Festival
 OFFICIAL SELECTION - 2017 Hawaii International Film Festival
 WINNER - Best Editing - 2017 London Independent Film Awards
 WINNER - Best Picture - 2018 New York Film Awards
 WINNER - Best Fantasy Film - 2018 New York Film Awards
 WINNER - Best Actress - 2018 New York Film Awards
 WINNER - Best Score - 2018 New York Film Awards
 WINNER - Best Visual Effects - 2018 New York Film Awards
 WINNER - Best Fantasy Film - 2018 Los Angeles Film Awards
 WINNER - Best Director - 2018 Los Angeles Film Awards
 WINNER - Best Cinematography - 2018 Los Angeles Film Awards
 WINNER - Best Editing - 2018 Los Angeles Film Awards
 WINNER - Best Director Diamond Award - 2018 NYC Indie Film Awards
 WINNER - Best Actor Diamond Award - 2018 NYC Indie Film Awards
 WINNER - Best VFX Diamond Award - 2018 NYC Indie Film Awards
 WINNER - Best Feature Film Gold Award - 2018 NYC Indie Film Awards

References

External links
 
Official "Wished" Site

2017 films
2017 comedy films
2010s fantasy comedy films
2010s Mandarin-language films
Chinese fantasy comedy films
Films about wish fulfillment
Films scored by Nathan Wang